Valerie Bradshaw (née Ziegenfuss; June 29, 1949) is an American former female professional tennis player. She started as an amateur player at the beginning of the 1970s, then turned professional.

She is most famous for being one of the Original 9 with eight of her fellow players, who rebelled against the United States Tennis Association in 1970. Their actions brought about the creation of the Virginia Slims Circuit, which was the basis for the WTA Tour.

During her career, she reached the fourth round at the French Open (in 1972) and the US Open on two occasions (1969 and 1975). She reached one singles final at the Virginia Slims of Oklahoma in 1972. After winning two rounds of qualifying, she defeated 5th seeded Helen Gourlay, No. 2 seed Francoise Durr, and Judy Dalton (seeded 6th) and then lost to Rosie Casals.

She had far more success in doubles tournaments, with 12 doubles final appearances, including six victories.

She won a bronze medal in doubles in the 1968 Olympics in Mexico City with Jane Bartkowicz.

Career review

Original 9
In 1970, the top women tennis players started to become frustrated at the lack of equality within tennis in terms of prize money on offer for male and female players. The publisher Gladys Heldman, founder of World Tennis magazine, offered $5,000 of her own money, which enabled the players to negotiate their own contracts. Ziegenfuss and the other players, including Billie Jean King and Rosie Casals, signed $1 contracts in the summer of 1970 and formed the Virginia Slims Circuit.

WTA Tour finals

Singles 1

Doubles 10 (6–4)

References

Notes
 The Original 9 featured Billie Jean King, Rosie Casals, Peaches Bartkowickz, Nancy Richey, Kerry Melville, Judy Dalton, Julie Heldman and Kristy Pigeon.
 The Virginia Slims Circuit was the name of the modern day circuit WTA circuit before the formation of the Women's Tennis Association in 1973. It became the WTA Tour in 1988.

External links

 
 
 

American female tennis players
Tennis players from San Diego
1949 births
Living people
Tennis players at the 1968 Summer Olympics
Medalists at the 1968 Summer Olympics
Olympic bronze medalists for the United States in tennis
21st-century American women